Vasum turbinellus is a species of gastropods belonging to the family Turbinellidae.

Description
The length of the shell varies between 36.7 mm and 86 mm.

The shell is yellowish white and chestnut-black, stained and obscurely banded. The aperture is yellowish white. The border of the outer lip is black-spotted.

Distribution
The species is found in Western Africa, Indian Ocean, Malesia,the Philippines,Indonesia, New Caledonia, the South China Sea, Australia.

Fossils have been found in Quaternary strata of Saudi Arabia (age range: 0.126 to 0.012 Ma).

References

 Drivas, J. & Jay, M. (1988). Coquillages de La Réunion et de l'Île Maurice. Collection les beautés de la nature. Delachaux et Niestlé: Neuchâtel. ISBN 2-603-00654-1. pp. 1-160.
 Liu, J.Y. [Ruiyu] (ed.). (2008). Checklist of marine biota of China seas. China Science Press. 1267 pp.
 B. Landau and C. Marques da Silva. 2010. Early Pliocene gastropods of Cubagua, Venezuela: Taxonomy, palaeobiogeography and ecostratigraphy. Palaeontos 19:1-221

External links
 Linnaeus, C. (1758). Systema Naturae per regna tria naturae, secundum classes, ordines, genera, species, cum characteribus, differentiis, synonymis, locis. Editio decima, reformata (10th revised edition), vol. 1: 824 pp. Laurentius Salvius: Holmiae
  Abbott, R. T. (1959). The family Vasidae in the Indo-Pacific. Indo-Pacific Mollusca. 1 (1): 15-32
 Perry, G. (1811). Conchology, or the natural history of shells: containing a new arrangement of the genera and species, illustrated by coloured engravings executed from the natural specimens, and including the latest discoveries. 4 pp., 61 plates. London. 
 Lamarck, (J.-B. M.) de. (1822). Histoire naturelle des animaux sans vertèbres. Tome septième. Paris: published by the Author, 711 pp.

Turbinellidae
Gastropods described in 1758